Heather Bishoff is a former Democratic member of the Ohio House of Representatives for the 20th district. She was elected in 2012, defeating Republican Nathan Burd with 59.28% of the vote. Previously she defeated Marco Miller to win the Democratic primary. Bishoff has served on the Gahanna-Jefferson Board of Education, has founded a financial company with her husband and is a veteran of the US Army.

Ohio House of Representatives

Heather Bishoff was a part of the 130th and 131st Ohio General Assembly and was elected to the 132nd on November 8, 2016. During her tenure, she served on the Armed Services, Veterans Affairs, and Public Safety Committee as well as the Health and Aging Committee. During the 131st General Assembly, she was named as a Ranking Member on the House Insurance Committee because of her experience in the financial industry.

Bishoff has been the sponsor of several bills throughout her terms. Most notably, House Bill 229, which was passed by both the House and Senate and signed off by the governor in June 2016, allows Ohio families to create their own private trust companies so they can manage their own trust's investments.

Electoral history

References

Living people
Democratic Party members of the Ohio House of Representatives
Franklin University alumni
United States Army soldiers
Year of birth missing (living people)
21st-century American politicians
Women state legislators in Ohio
21st-century American women politicians
People from Franklin County, Ohio